Agha Shahid Ali (4 February 1949 – 8 December 2001) was an Indian-born poet, of Afghan and Indian descent, who immigrated to the United States, and became affiliated with the literary movement known as New Formalism in American poetry. His collections include A Walk Through the Yellow Pages, The Half-Inch Himalayas, A Nostalgist's Map of America, The Country Without a Post Office, and Rooms Are Never Finished, the latter a finalist for the National Book Award in 2001.

The University of Utah Press awards the Agha Shahid Ali Poetry Prize annually in memory of this "celebrated poet and beloved teacher."

Early life and education
Agha Shahid Ali was born on February 4, 1949, in New Delhi, East Punjab, Dominion of India, into the illustrious Afghan Qizilbashi Agha family in Srinagar, Kashmir. He grew up in India's Kashmir Valley, and left for the United States in 1976. Shahid's father Agha Ashraf Ali was a renowned educationist. His grandmother Begum Zaffar Ali was the first woman matriculate of Kashmir. Shahid was educated at the Burn Hall School, later University of Kashmir and Hindu College, University of Delhi. He earned a PhD in English from Pennsylvania State University in 1984, and an M.F.A. from the University of Arizona in 1985. He held teaching positions at nine universities and colleges in India and the United States.

Shahid was born a Shia Muslim, but his upbringing was secular. Shahid and his brother Iqbal both studied at an Irish Catholic parochial school and, in an interview, he recalled that: "There was never a hint of any kind of parochialism in the home."

He died of brain cancer in December 2001 and was buried in Northampton, Massachusetts, in the vicinity of Amherst, a town sacred to his beloved poet Emily Dickinson.

Literary work
Ali expressed his love and concern for his people in In Memory of Begum Akhtar and The Country Without a Post Office, which was written with the Kashmir conflict as a backdrop. He was a translator of Urdu poet Faiz Ahmed Faiz (The Rebel's Silhouette; Selected Poems), and editor for the Middle East and Central Asia segment of Jeffery Paine's Poetry of Our World. He also compiled the volume Ravishing DisUnities: Real Ghazals in English. His last book was Call Me Ishmael Tonight, a collection of English ghazals, and his poems are featured in American Alphabets: 25 Contemporary Poets (2006) and other anthologies.

Ali taught at the MFA Program for Poets & Writers at University of Massachusetts Amherst, at the MFA Writing Seminars at Bennington College as well as at creative writing programs at University of Utah, Baruch College, Warren Wilson College, Hamilton College and New York University.

Personal life 
Ali never married. He was gay.

Bibliography 
This list represents the published output of Ali, arranged in chronological order and sorted by the manner in which he contributed to the work in question.

Poetry 

 Bone Sculpture (1972), 
 In Memory of Begum Akhtar and Other Poems (1979), 
 The Half-Inch Himalayas (1987), 
 A Walk Through the Yellow Pages (1987), 
 A Nostalgist's Map of America (1991), 
 The Beloved Witness: Selected Poems (1992), 
 The Country Without a Post Office (1997), 
 Rooms Are Never Finished (2001), 
 Call Me Ishmael Tonight: A Book of Ghazals (2003).

Translations and edited volumes 

 Translator, The Rebel's Silhouette: Selected Poems by Faiz Ahmed Faiz (1992),
 Editor, Ravishing Disunities: Real Ghazals in English (2000).

Influences
Ali was deeply moved by the music of Begum Akhtar. The two had met through a friend of Akhtar's when Ali was a teenager and her music became a lasting presence in his life. Features of her ghazal rendition—such as wit, wordplay and nakhra (affectation)—were present in Ali's poetry as well. However, Amitav Ghosh suspects that the strongest connection between the two rose from the idea that "sorrow has no finer mask than a studied lightness of manner"—traces of which were seen in Ali's and Akhtar's demeanor in their respective lives.

Awards 

 Pushcart Prize
 Guggenheim Fellowship in 1996
Bread Loaf Writers' Conference Fellowship
Ingram-Merrill Foundation Fellowship
New York Foundation for the Arts Fellowship

Notes

References

Further reading
'I Write on that Void: Kashmir, Kaschmir, Cashmere, Qashmir' – Remembering Agha Shahid Ali The Wire
Looking for Shahid The Hindu
Eric Pace (26 December 2001) Agha Shahid Ali, 52, a Poet Who Had Roots in Kashmir The New York Times
Brief biography at the University of Massachusetts
How the legendary Begum Akhtar influenced the life and poetry of Agha Shahid Ali

External links
 Agha Shahid Ali at Poets.org
 Agha Shahid Ali at the Poetry Foundation
 Agha Shahid Ali prize, University of Utah Press
 'I swear...I have my hopes: Agha Shahid Ali's Delhi Years', Kafila.org
 'The Veilied Suite: The Collected Poems by Agha Shahid Ali' biblio-india.org, March–April 2010.

1949 births
2001 deaths
20th-century American male writers
20th-century English male writers
20th-century Indian poets
Kashmiri people
20th-century Indian Muslims
Kashmiri Muslims
American gay writers
American LGBT poets
American male poets
American male writers of Indian descent
American people of Indian descent
American people of Kashmiri descent
English male poets
Formalist poets
Ghazal
Hindu College, Delhi alumni
Indian people of Afghan descent
Indian emigrants to the United States
Indian LGBT poets
Muslim poets
New York University faculty
Pennsylvania State University alumni
PEN Oakland/Josephine Miles Literary Award winners
Translators from Urdu
University of Arizona alumni
University of Kashmir alumni
University of Massachusetts Amherst faculty
University of Utah faculty
Urdu–English translators
Gay poets